Ivančić is a Croatian surname, and stems from the male given name Ivan. Notable people with the surname include:

Antonio Ivančić (born 1995), Croatian footballer
Ivan Ivančić (1937–2014), Bosnian-Croatian athletics coach and shot putter
Josip Ivančić (born 1991), Croatian professional footballer
Karlo Ivancic (born 1994), Croatian footballer
Kruno Ivančić (born 1994), Croatian football winger
Mirko Ivančić (born 1960), Croatian rower
Mladen Ivančić (born 1970), Croatian former professional football defender
Nina Ivančić (born 1953), Croatian artist 
Tomislav Ivančić (1938–2017), Croatian theologian and academic
Viktor Ivančić (born 1960), Croatian journalist
Zoran Ivančić (born 1975), Croatian retired football defender

See also 
 Ivanić
 Ivanović
 Ivančević

References 

Croatian surnames
Surnames from given names